Raymond Warren (born 1928) is a British composer and teacher.

Raymond or Ray Warren may also refer to:

Ray Warren (born 1943), Australian sports commentator
Ray Warren (footballer) (1918–1988), English footballer
T. Raymond Warren, American politician and sheriff
Raymond A. Warren, American politician and judge